Judith Rosemary Locke Chalmers  (born 10 October 1935) is a British television presenter who is best known for presenting the travel programme Wish You Were Here...? from 1974 to 2003.

Early life
Chalmers was born in Gatley, Cheshire. Her father was an architect and her mother a medical secretary. She had a sister, Sandra Chalmers. Both sisters were educated at Withington Girls' School, an independent day school in Fallowfield near Withington, Manchester.

Career
Chalmers began broadcasting for the BBC when she was only 13, after being selected for BBC Northern Children's Hour by producer Trevor Hill. Her younger sister Sandra,  who was later editor of Woman's Hour, also performed on Children's Hour. Chalmers presented many programmes from Manchester, including Children's Television Club which later metamorphosed into Blue Peter based in London. She spent some time at secretarial college in Manchester in the early 1950s.

In the 1960s, Chalmers presented two major BBC radio programmes: Family Favourites and Woman's Hour. She also appeared as the original Susan in The Clitheroe Kid, and was a foil for Ken Dodd in his radio show. Chalmers presented ballroom dancing competition programme Come Dancing for the BBC from 1961 to 1965.

During the 1970s, Chalmers regularly presented ITV's daytime magazine programme Good Afternoon and its successors, which included Afternoon Plus and A Plus. She started presenting ITV's holiday programme Wish You Were Here? in 1974 and continued in this role until 2003, initially working alongside Chris Kelly, and later with John Carter.

In the 1980s Chalmers was a regular host of the Miss World contest on ITV, also presenting the associated UK beauty pageants such as Miss United Kingdom and the British Beauty Championships. Chalmers presented BBC Radio 2's mid-morning show from 1990 to 1992, taking over from Ken Bruce, who took over the show again following Chalmers's departure from the station in 1992.

In 2001, Chalmers appeared on Lily Savage's Blankety Blank. She took part in an episode of the BBC 2 series Celebrity Antiques Road Trip, with her son Mark, in 2013.

Her television appearances in later years have been limited to short spots on chat show programmes such as Good Morning Britain, Lorraine and Graham Norton's chat shows. In 2017, Chalmers took part in Channel 5’s Celebrity Taste of Italy.

Personal life
Chalmers has been married to sports commentator Neil Durden-Smith since 1964. The couple live in north London and have two children, television presenter Mark and Emma. Chalmers has six grandchildren.

She was awarded an OBE in 1994.

References

1935 births
Living people
English radio DJs
English reporters and correspondents
English television presenters
English voice actresses
English television actresses
BBC Radio 2 presenters
Officers of the Order of the British Empire
People from Stockport
People educated at Withington Girls' School
Beauty pageant hosts
British women radio presenters
British women television presenters
Woman's Hour